Yeh To Kamaal Ho Gaya is a 1982 Indian Hindi-language film directed by T. Rama Rao. It stars Kamal Haasan in a double role, with Poonam Dhillon in the lead roles and is a remake of his own acted Tamil film Sattam En Kaiyil (1978).

Plot
Rasik Bihari Saxena (Om Shivpuri) a corrupt lawyer sends the child of thief Shankar Chander (Satyen Kappu) to juvenile-jail for doing murder. Shankar abducts one of Rasik's twin children from hospital after their birth. Shankar keeps this boy with him and names him Ratan (Kamal Haasan), Shankar's wife Shanta (Kumud Bole) nurtures Ratan. Shankar teaches Ratan how to steal money, good things etc. from people. On the other hand, Rasik's child is now adult and his name is Ajay Saxena (also Kamal Haasan), he has studied in abroad and married a foreigner girl. Rasik don't like the foreigner girl, seeing this by anger Ajay leaves home. Ajay is arrested for being guilty of killing a girl named Ruby Gupta. Knowing this, Shankar tells Ratan to go to Rasik's home and to pretend to be Ajay, Ratan abides by his father. In the end of this film Rasik's wife Laxmi (Ashalata Wabgaonkar) understands that both the same looking boys (Ratan and Ajay) are actually her own sons.

Cast
Kamal Haasan as Ratan Chandar / Ajay Saxena (Double Role)
Poonam Dhillon as Priya Singh
Vijay Arora as Advocate Mahesh Chandar
Ranjeet as Chandru Singh
Om Shivpuri as Advocate Rasik Bihari Saxena
Ashalata Wabgaonkar as Laxmi Saxena
Satyen Kappu as Shankar Chandar
Kumud Bole as Shanta Chandar
Suresh Chatwal as Auditorium Manager
Raj Mehra as Mohan Singh
Dina Pathak as Durga Singh
Shashikala as Guest Appearance
Tun Tun as Guest Appearance

Release 
The film was released on 29 October 1982. It was a box office success and had a theatrical run of 175 days.

Soundtrack

The film's music was composed by R. D. Burman and lyrics were penned by Anand Bakshi. Veteran singer S. P. Balasubrahmanyam collaborated with R. D. Burman for the first time in this film. Though the film Mangalsutra was released before a year, where S. P. Balasubrahmanyam sang a song under the music of R. D. Burman.

References

External links

1980s Hindi-language films
1982 films
Films directed by T. Rama Rao
Films scored by R. D. Burman
Hindi remakes of Tamil films